Skype is a proprietary telecommunications application operated by Skype Technologies, a division of Microsoft, best known for VoIP-based videotelephony, videoconferencing and voice calls. It also has instant messaging, file transfer, debit-based calls to landline and mobile telephones (over traditional telephone networks), and other features. Skype is available on various desktop, mobile, and video game console platforms.

Skype was created by Niklas Zennström, Janus Friis, and four Estonian developers and first released in August 2003. In September 2005, eBay acquired Skype for $2.6 billion. In September 2009, Silver Lake, Andreessen Horowitz, and the Canada Pension Plan Investment Board bought 65% of Skype for $1.9 billion from eBay, valuing the business at $2.92 billion. In May 2011, Microsoft bought Skype for $8.5 billion and used it to replace their Windows Live Messenger. As of 2011, most of the development team and 44% of all the division's employees were in Tallinn and Tartu, Estonia.

Skype originally featured a hybrid peer-to-peer and client–server system. It became entirely powered by Microsoft-operated supernodes in May 2012; in 2017, it changed from a peer-to-peer service to a centralized Azure-based service.

As of March 2020, Skype was used by 100 million people at least once a month and by 40 million people each day. During the COVID-19 pandemic, Skype lost a large part of its market share to Zoom.

Etymology 
The name for the software is derived from "Sky peer-to-peer", which was then abbreviated to "Skyper". However, some of the domain names associated with "Skyper" were already taken. Dropping the final "r" left the current title "Skype", for which domain names were available.

History 

Skype was founded in 2003 by Niklas Zennström, from Sweden, and Janus Friis, from Denmark. The Skype software was created by Estonians Ahti Heinla, Priit Kasesalu, Jaan Tallinn, and Toivo Annus. Friis and Annus are credited with the idea of reducing the cost of voice calls by using a P2P protocol like that of Kazaa. An early alpha version was created and tested in spring 2003, and the first public beta version was released on 29 August 2003.

In June 2005, Skype entered an agreement with the Polish web portal Onet.pl for an integrated offering on the Polish market. On 12 September 2005, eBay Inc. agreed to acquire Luxembourg-based Skype Technologies SA for approximately US$2.5 billion in up-front cash and eBay stock, plus potential performance-based consideration. On 1 September 2009, eBay announced it was selling 65% of Skype to Silver Lake, Andreessen Horowitz, and the Canada Pension Plan Investment Board for US$1.9 billion, valuing Skype at US$2.75 billion. On 14 July 2011, Skype partnered with Comcast to bring its video chat service to Comcast subscribers via HDTV sets.

On 17 June 2013, Skype released a free video messaging service, which can be operated on Windows, Mac OS, iOS, iPadOS, Android, and BlackBerry.

Between 2017 and 2020, Skype collaborated with PayPal to provide a money-send feature. It allowed users to transfer funds via the Skype mobile app in the middle of a conversation.

In 2019, Skype was announced to be the sixth most downloaded mobile app of the decade, from 2010 to 2019.

Microsoft acquisition 

On 10 May 2011, Microsoft Corporation acquired Skype Communications, S.à r.l for US$8.5 billion. The company was incorporated as a division of Microsoft, which acquired all its technologies with the purchase. The acquisition was completed on 13 October 2011. Shortly after the acquisition, Microsoft began integrating the Skype service with its own products. Along with taking over the development of existing Skype desktop and mobile apps, the company developed a dedicated client app for its then-newly released, touch-focused Windows 8 and Windows RT operating systems. They were made available from Windows Store when the then-new OS launched on 26 October 2012. The following year, it became the default messaging app for Windows 8.1, replacing the Windows 8 Messaging app at the time, and became pre-installed software on every device that came with or upgraded to 8.1.

In a month-long transition from 8 to 30 April 2013, Microsoft discontinued two of its own products in favor of Skype, including its Windows Live Messenger instant messaging service, although Messenger continued to be available in mainland China. 

On 11 November 2014, Microsoft announced that in 2015, its Lync product would be replaced by Skype for Business. This combined features of Lync and the consumer Skype software. There are two user interfaces, organizations could switch their users between the default Skype for Business interface to the Lync interface.

Post-acquisition 
On 12 August 2013, Skype released the 4.10 update to the app for Apple iPhone and iPad that allows HD quality video for iPhone 5 and fourth-generation iPads.

On 20 November 2014, Microsoft Office's team announced that a new chat powered by Skype would be implemented in their software, giving tools to be able to chat with co-workers in the same document.

On 15 September 2015, Skype announced the release of Mojis, "a brand new way to express yourself on Skype". Mojis are short clips/gifs featuring characters from films and TV shows to be entered into conversations with the same ease as emoticons. They worked with Universal Studios, Disney Muppets, BBC and other studios to add to the available collection of Mojis. Later that year, Gurdeep Singh Pall, Corporate Vice President of Skype, announced that Microsoft had acquired the technology from Talko.

In July 2016, Skype introduced an early Alpha version of a new Skype for Linux client, built with WebRTC technology, after several petitions had asked Microsoft to continue development for Linux. In September of that year, Skype updated their iOS app with new features, including an option to call contacts on Skype through Siri voice commands. In October of that year, Microsoft launched Skype for Business for Mac.

In February 2017, Microsoft announced plans to discontinue its Skype Wi-Fi service globally. The application was delisted, and the service itself became non-functional from 31 March 2017. On 5 June 2017, Microsoft announced its plans to revamp Skype with similar features to Snapchat, allowing users to share temporary copies of their photos and video files. In late June 2017, Microsoft rolled out their latest update for iOS, incorporating a revamped design and new third-party integrations, with platforms including Gfycat, YouTube, and UpWorthy. It was not well-received, with numerous negative reviews and complaints that the new client broke existing functionality. Skype later removed this "makeover". In December 2017, Microsoft added "Skype Interviews", a shared code editing system for those wishing to hold job interviews for programming roles.

Microsoft eventually moved the service from a peer-to-peer to a central server based system, and with it adjusted the user interfaces of apps to make text-based messaging more prominent than voice calling. Skype for Windows, iOS, Android, Mac and Linux all received significant visual overhauls at this time.

Features 

Registered users of Skype are identified by a unique Skype ID and may be listed in the Skype directory under a Skype username. Skype allows these registered users to communicate through both instant messaging and voice chat. Voice chat allows telephone calls between pairs of users and conference calling and uses proprietary audio codec. Skype's text chat client allows group chats, emoticons, storing chat history, and editing of previous messages. Offline messages were implemented in a beta build of version 5 but removed after a few weeks without notification. The usual features familiar to instant messaging users—user profiles, online status indicators, and so on—are also included.

The Online Number, a.k.a. SkypeIn, service allows Skype users to receive calls on their computers dialed by conventional phone subscribers to a local Skype phone number; local numbers are available for Australia, Belgium, Brazil, Chile, Colombia, Denmark, the Dominican Republic, Estonia, Finland, France, Germany, Hong Kong, Hungary, India, Ireland, Japan, Mexico, Nepal, New Zealand, Poland, Romania, South Africa, South Korea, Sweden, Switzerland, Turkey, the Netherlands, the United Kingdom, and the United States. A Skype user can have local numbers in any of these countries, with calls to the number charged at the same rate as calls to fixed lines in the country.

Skype supports conference calls, video chats, and screen sharing between 25 people at a time for free, which then increased to 50 on 5 April 2019.

Skype does not provide the ability to call emergency numbers, such as 112 in Europe, 911 in North America, 999 in the UK or 100 in India and Nepal. However, as of December 2012, there is limited support for emergency calls in the United Kingdom, Australia, Denmark, and Finland. The U.S. Federal Communications Commission (FCC) has ruled that, for the purposes of section 255 of the Telecommunications Act, Skype is not an "interconnected VoIP provider". As a result, the U.S. National Emergency Number Association recommends that all VoIP users have an analog line available as a backup.

In 2019, Skype added an option to blur the background in a video chat interface using AI algorithms purely done using software, despite a depth-sensing camera not being present in most webcams.

Usage and traffic 

At the end of 2010, there were over 660 million worldwide users, with over 300 million estimated active each month as of August 2015. At one point in February 2012, there were 34 million users concurrently online on Skype.

In January 2011, after the release of video calling on the Skype client for iPhone, Skype reached a record 27 million simultaneous online users. This record was broken with 29 million simultaneous online users on 21 February 2011 and again on 28 March 2011 with 30 million online users. On 25 February 2012, Skype announced that it has over 32 million users for the first time ever. By 5 March 2012, it had 36 million simultaneous online users, and less than a year later, on 21 January 2013, Skype had more than 50 million concurrent users online.
In June 2012, Skype had surpassed 70 million downloads on Android.

On 19 July 2012, Microsoft announced that Skype users had logged 115 billion minutes of calls in the quarter, up to 50% since the last quarter.

On 15 January 2014, TeleGeography estimated that Skype-to-Skype international traffic has gone up to 36% in 2013 to 214 billion minutes.

At end March 2020 there was a 70% increase in the number of daily users from the previous month, due to the COVID-19 pandemic.

System and software

Client applications and devices

Windows client 

Multiple different versions of Skype have been released for Windows since its conception. The original line of Skype applications continued from versions 1.0 through 4.0. It has offered a desktop-only program since 2003. Later, a mobile version was created for Windows Phones.

In 2012, Skype introduced a new version for Windows 8 similar to the Windows Phone version. On 7 July 2015 Skype modified the application to direct Windows users to download the desktop version, but it was set to continue working on Windows RT until October 2016. In November 2015, Skype introduced three new applications, called Messaging, Skype Video, and Phone, intended to provide an integrated Skype experience on Windows 10. On 24 March 2016, Skype announced the integrated applications did not satisfy most users' needs and announced that they and the desktop client would eventually be replaced with a new UWP application, which was released as a preview version for the Windows 10 Anniversary Update and dubbed as the stable version with the release of the Windows 10 Creators Update.

The latest version of Skype for Windows is Skype 11, which is based on the Universal Windows Platform and runs on various Windows 10-related systems, including Xbox One, Xbox Series X/S, Windows phones, and Microsoft Hololens. Microsoft still offers the older Skype 8, which is Win32-based and runs on all systems from Windows XP (which is otherwise unsupported by Microsoft) to the most recent release of Windows 10.

In late 2017, this version was upgraded to Skype 12.9 in which several features were both removed and added.

Other desktop clients 

 macOS (10.9 or newer)
 Linux (Debian, Debian-based (Ubuntu, etc.), Fedora, openSUSE)

Mobile clients 
 iOS
 Android
Skype was previously available on Nokia X, Symbian, BlackBerry OS and BlackBerry 10 devices. 
In May 2009 a Version 3.0 was available on Windows Mobile 5 to 6.1, and in September 2015 a Version 2.29 was available on Windows Phone 8.1; in 2016 Microsoft announced that this would stop working in early 2017 once Skype's transition from peer-to-peer to client-server was complete.

Other platforms 
 The Nokia N800, N810, and N900 Internet tablets, which run Maemo
 The Nokia N9, which runs MeeGo, comes with Skype voice calling and text messaging integrated; however, it lacks video-calling.
 Both the Sony mylo COM-1 and COM-2 models
 The PlayStation Portable Slim and Lite series, though the user needs to purchase a specially designed microphone peripheral. The PSP-3000 has a built-in microphone, which allows communication without the Skype peripheral. The PSP Go has the ability to use Bluetooth connections with the Skype application, in addition to its built-in microphone. Skype for PlayStation Vita may be downloaded via the PlayStation Network in the U.S. It includes the capability to receive incoming calls with the application running in the background.
 The Samsung Smart TV had a Skype app, which could be downloaded for free. It used the built-in camera and microphone for the newer models. Alternatively, a separate mountable Skype camera with built-in speakers and microphones is available to purchase for older models. This functionality has now been disabled along with any other "TV Based" Skype clients.
 Some devices were made to work with Skype by talking to a desktop Skype client or by embedding Skype software into the device. These were usually either tethered to a PC or have a built-in Wi-Fi client to allow calling from Wi-Fi hotspots, like the Netgear SPH101 Skype Wi-Fi Phone, the SMC WSKP100 Skype Wi-Fi Phone, the Belkin F1PP000GN-SK Wi-Fi Skype Phone, the Panasonic KX-WP1050 Wi-Fi Phone for Skype Executive Travel Set, the IPEVO So-20 Wi-Fi Phone for Skype and the Linksys CIT200 Wi-Fi Phone.

Third-party licensing 
Third-party developers, such as Truphone, Nimbuzz, and Fring, previously allowed Skype to run in parallel with several other competing VoIP/IM networks (Truphone and Nimbuzz provide TruphoneOut and NimbuzzOut as a competing paid service) in any Symbian or Java environment. Nimbuzz made Skype available to BlackBerry users and Fring provided mobile video calling over Skype as well as support for the Android platform. Skype disabled access to Skype by Fring users in July 2010. Nimbuzz discontinued support of Skype on request in October 2010.

Before and during the Microsoft acquisition, Skype withdrew licensing from several third parties producing software and hardware compatible with Skype. The Skype for Asterisk product from Digium was withdrawn as "no longer available for sale". The Senao SN358+ long-range (10–15 km) cordless phone was discontinued due to loss of licenses to participate in the Skype network as peers. In combination, these two products made it possible to create roaming cordless mesh networks with a robust handoff.

Technology

Protocol 

Skype uses a proprietary Internet telephony (VoIP) network called the Skype protocol. The protocol has not been made publicly available by Skype, and official applications using the protocol are also proprietary. Part of the Skype technology relies on the Global Index P2P protocol belonging to the Joltid Ltd. corporation. The main difference between Skype and standard VoIP clients is that Skype operates on a peer-to-peer model (originally based on the Kazaa software), rather than the more usual client–server model (note that the very popular Session Initiation Protocol (SIP) model of VoIP is also peer-to-peer, but implementation generally requires registration with a server, as does Skype).

On 20 June 2014, Microsoft announced the deprecation of the old Skype protocol. Within several months from this date, in order to continue using Skype services, Skype users will have to update to Skype applications released in 2014. The new Skype protocol, Microsoft Notification Protocol 24, was released. The deprecation became effective in the second week of August 2014. Transferred files are now saved on central servers.

As far as networking stack support is concerned, Skype only supports the IPv4 protocol. It lacks support for the next-generation Internet protocol, IPv6. Skype for Business, however, includes support for IPv6 addresses, along with continued support of IPv4.

Protocol detection and control 
Many networking and security companies have claimed to detect and control Skype's protocol for enterprise and carrier applications. While the specific detection methods used by these companies are often private, Pearson's chi-squared test and naive Bayes classification are two approaches that were published in 2008. Combining statistical measurements of payload properties (such as byte frequencies and initial byte sequences) as well as flow properties (like packet sizes and packet directions) has also shown to be an effective method for identifying Skype's TCP- and UDP-based protocols.

Audio codecs 
Skype 2.x used G.729, Skype 3.2 introduced SVOPC, and Skype 4.0 added a Skype-created codec called :SILK, intended to be "lightweight and embeddable". Additionally, Skype has released Opus as a free codec, which integrates the SILK codec principles for voice transmission with the CELT codec principles for higher-quality audio transmissions, such as live music performances. Opus was submitted to the Internet Engineering Task Force (IETF) in September 2010. Since then, it has been standardized as RFC 6716.

Video codecs 
VP7 is used for versions prior to Skype 5.5.

As of version 7.0, H.264 is used for both group and one-on-one video chat, at standard definition, 720p and 1080p high-definition.

Skype Qik 
Skype acquired the video service Qik in 2011. After shutting down Qik in April 2014, Skype relaunched the service as Skype Qik on 14 October 2014. Although Qik offered video conferencing and Internet streaming, the new service focuses on mobile video messaging between individuals and groups.

Hyperlink format 
Skype uses URIs as skype:USER?call for a call.

Security and privacy 

Skype was claimed initially to be a secure communication, with one of its early web pages stating "highly secure with end-to-end encryption". Security services were invisible to the user, and encryption cannot be disabled. Skype claims to use publicly documented, widely trusted encryption techniques for Skype-to-Skype communication: RSA for key negotiation and the Advanced Encryption Standard to encrypt conversations. However, it is impossible to verify that these algorithms are used correctly, completely, and at all times, as there is no public review possible without a protocol specification and/or the program's source code. Skype provides an uncontrolled registration system for users with no proof of identity. Instead, users may choose a screen name which does not have to relate to their real-life identity in any way; a name chosen could also be an impersonation attempt, where the user claims to be someone else for fraudulent purposes. A third-party paper analyzing the security and methodology of Skype was presented at Black Hat Europe 2006. It analyzed Skype and found a number of security issues with the then-current security model.

Skype incorporates some features that tend to hide its traffic, but it is not specifically designed to thwart traffic analysis and therefore does not provide anonymous communication. Some researchers have been able to watermark the traffic so that it is identifiable even after passing through an anonymizing network.

In an interview, Kurt Sauer, the Chief Security Officer of Skype, said, "We provide a safe communication option. I will not tell you whether we can listen or not." This does not deny the fact that the U.S. National Security Agency (NSA) monitors Skype conversations. Skype's client uses an undocumented and proprietary protocol. The Free Software Foundation (FSF) is concerned about user privacy issues arising from using proprietary software and protocols and has made a replacement for Skype one of their high-priority projects. Security researchers Biondi and Desclaux have speculated that Skype may have a back door, since Skype sends traffic even when it is turned off and because Skype has taken extreme measures to obfuscate the program's traffic and functioning. Several media sources reported that at a meeting about the "Lawful interception of IP based services" held on 25 June 2008, high-ranking unnamed officials at the Austrian interior ministry said that they could listen in on Skype conversations without problems. Austrian public broadcasting service ORF, citing minutes from the meeting, reported that "the Austrian police are able to listen in on Skype connections". Skype declined to comment on the reports. One easily demonstrated method of monitoring is to set up two computers with the same Skype user ID and password. When a message is typed or a call is received on one computer, the second computer duplicates the audio and text. This requires knowledge of the user ID and password.

The United States Federal Communications Commission (FCC) has interpreted the Communications Assistance for Law Enforcement Act (CALEA) as requiring digital phone networks to allow wiretapping if authorized by an FBI warrant, in the same way as other phone services. In February 2009, Skype said that, not being a telephone company owning phone lines, it is exempt from CALEA and similar laws, which regulate US phone companies, and it is not clear whether Skype could support wiretapping even if it wanted to. According to the ACLU, the Act is inconsistent with the original intent of the Fourth Amendment to the U.S. Constitution; more recently, the ACLU has expressed the concern that the FCC interpretation of the Act is incorrect. It has been suggested that Microsoft made changes to Skype's infrastructure to ease various wiretapping requirements; however, Skype denies the claims.

Sometime before Skype was sold in 2009, the company had started Project Chess, a program to explore legal and technical ways to easily share calls with intelligence agencies and law enforcement.

On 20 February 2009, the European Union's Eurojust agency announced that the Italian Desk at Eurojust would "play a key role in the coordination and cooperation of the investigations on the use of internet telephony systems (VoIP), such as 'Skype'. [...] The purpose of Eurojust's coordination role is to overcome the technical and judicial obstacles to the interception of internet telephony systems, taking into account the various data protection rules and civil rights."

In November 2010, a flaw was disclosed to Skype that showed how computer crackers could secretly track any user's IP address. Due to Skype's peer-to-peer nature, this was a difficult issue to address, but this bug was eventually remedied in a 2016 update.

In 2012, Skype introduced automatic updates to better protect users from security risks but received some challenge from users of the Mac product, as the updates cannot be disabled from version 5.6 on, both on Mac OS and Windows versions, although in the latter, and only from version 5.9 on, automatic updating can be turned off in certain cases.

According to a 2012 Washington Post article, Skype "has expanded its cooperation with law enforcement authorities to make online chats and other user information available to police"; the article additionally mentions Skype made changes to allow authorities access to addresses and credit card numbers.

In November 2012, Skype was reported to have handed over user data of a pro-WikiLeaks activist to Dallas, Texas-based private security company iSIGHT Partners without a warrant or court order. The alleged handover would be a breach of Skype's privacy policy. Skype responded with a statement that it launched an internal investigation to probe the breach of user data privacy.

On 13 November 2012, a Russian user published a flaw in Skype's security, which allowed any person to take over a Skype account knowing only the victim's email by following seven steps. This vulnerability was claimed to exist for months and existed for more than 12 hours since published widely.

On 14 May 2013, it was documented that a URL sent via a Skype instant messaging session was usurped by the Skype service and subsequently used in a HTTP HEAD query originating from an IP address registered to Microsoft in Redmond (the IP address used was 65.52.100.214). The Microsoft query used the full URL supplied in the IM conversation and was generated by a previously undocumented security service. Security experts speculate the action was triggered by a technology similar to Microsoft's SmartScreen Filter used in its browsers.

The 2013 mass surveillance disclosures revealed that agencies such as the NSA and the FBI have the ability to eavesdrop on Skype, including the monitoring and storage of text and video calls and file transfers. The PRISM surveillance program, which requires FISA court authorization, reportedly has allowed the NSA unfettered access to its data center supernodes. According to the leaked documents, integration work began in November 2010, but it was not until February 2011 that the company was served with a directive to comply signed by the attorney general, with NSA documents showing that collection began on 31 March 2011.

On 10 November 2014, Skype scored 1 out of 7 points on the Electronic Frontier Foundation's secure messaging scorecard. Skype received a point for encryption during transit but lost points because communications are not encrypted with a key the provider does not have access to (i.e. the communications are not end-to-end encrypted), users cannot verify contacts' identities, past messages are not secure if the encryption keys are stolen (i.e. the service does not provide forward secrecy), the code is not open to independent review (i.e. not available to merely view, nor under a free-software license), the security design is not properly documented, and there has not been a recent independent security audit. AIM, BlackBerry Messenger, Ebuddy XMS, Hushmail, Kik Messenger, Viber and Yahoo Messenger also scored 1 out of 7 points.

As of August 2018, Skype now supports end-to-end encryption across all platforms.

Cybercrime on application
Cybersex trafficking has occurred on Skype and other videoconferencing applications. According to the Australian Federal Police, overseas pedophiles are directing child sex abuse using its live streaming services.

Service in the People's Republic of China 

Since September 2007, users in China trying to download the Skype software client have been redirected to the site of TOM Online, a joint venture between a Chinese wireless operator and Skype, from which a modified Chinese version can be downloaded. The TOM client participates in China's system of Internet censorship, monitoring text messages between Skype users in China as well as messages exchanged with users outside the country. Niklas Zennström, then chief executive of Skype, told reporters that TOM "had implemented a text filter, which is what everyone else in that market is doing. Those are the regulations." He also stated, "One thing that's certain is that those things are in no way jeopardising the privacy or the security of any of the users."

In October 2008, it was reported that TOM had been saving the full message contents of some Skype text conversations on its servers, apparently focusing on conversations containing political issues such as Tibet, Falun Gong, Taiwan independence, and the Chinese Communist Party. The saved messages contain personally identifiable information about the message senders and recipients, including IP addresses, usernames, landline phone numbers, and the entire content of the text messages, including the time and date of each message. Information about Skype users outside China who were communicating with a TOM-Skype user was also saved. A server misconfiguration made these log files accessible to the public for a time.

Research on the TOM-Skype venture has revealed information about blacklisted keyword checks, allowing censorship and surveillance of its users. The partnership has received much criticism for the latter. Microsoft remains unavailable for comment on the issue.

According to reports from the advocacy group Great Fire, Microsoft has modified censorship restrictions and ensured encryption of all user information. Furthermore, Microsoft is now partnered with Guangming Founder (GMF) in China.

All attempts to visit the official Skype web page from mainland China redirects the user to skype.gmw.cn. The Linux version of Skype is unavailable.

Localization 
Skype comes bundled with the following locales and languages: Arabic, Bulgarian, Catalan, Chinese (Traditional and Simplified), Croatian, Czech, Danish, Dutch, English, Estonian, Finnish, French, German, Greek, Hebrew, Hungarian, Indonesian, Italian, Japanese, Korean, Latvian, Lithuanian, Nepali, Norwegian, Polish, Portuguese (Brazilian and European), Romanian, Russian, Serbian, Slovak, Slovenian, Spanish, Swedish, Thai, Turkish, Ukrainian, and Vietnamese.

As the Windows desktop program offers users the option of creating new language files, at least 80 other (full or partial) localizations are also available for many languages.

Customer service 
In January 2010, Skype rescinded its policy of seizing funds in Skype accounts that have been inactive (no paid call) for 180 days. This was in settlement of a class-action lawsuit. Skype also paid up to US$4 to persons who opted into the action.

As of February 2012, Skype provides support through their web support portal, support community, @skypesupport on Twitter, and Skype Facebook page. Direct contact via email and live chat is available through their web support portal. Chat Support is a premium feature available to Skype Premium and some other paid users.

Skype's refund policy states that they will provide refunds in full if customers have used less than 1 euro of their Skype Credit. "Upon a duly submitted request, Skype will refund you on a pro-rata basis for the unused period of a Product".

Skype has come under some criticism from users for the inability to completely close accounts. Users not wanting to continue using Skype can make their account inactive by deleting all personal information, except for the username.

Due to an outage on 21 September 2015 that affected several users in New Zealand, Australia, and other countries, Skype decided to compensate their customers with 20 minutes of free calls to over 60 landline and 8 mobile phone destinations.

Educational use 
Although Skype is a commercial product, its non-paid version is used with increasing frequency among teachers, schools, and charities interested in global education projects. A popular use case is to facilitate language learning through conversations that alternate between each participant's native language.

The video conferencing aspect of the software has been praised for its ability to connect students who speak different languages, facilitate virtual field trips, and engage directly with experts.

Skype in the classroom is another free-of-charge tool that Skype has set up on its website, designed to encourage teachers to make their classrooms more interactive, and collaborate with other teachers around the world. There are various Skype lessons in which students can participate. Teachers can also use a search tool and find experts in a particular field. The educational program Skype a Scientist, set up by biologist Sarah McAnulty in 2017, had in two years connected 14,312 classrooms with over 7000 volunteer scientists.

However, Skype is not adopted universally, with many educational institutions in the United States and Europe blocking the application from their networks.

See also 

 Caller ID spoofing
 Censorship of Skype
 Comparison of cross-platform instant messaging clients
 Comparison of instant messaging protocols
 Comparison of VoIP software
 List of video telecommunication services and product brands
 Mobile VoIP
 Presence information
 Unified communications

References

External links 

 

 
2003 software
2011 mergers and acquisitions
Android (operating system) software
Android Auto software
Companies in the PRISM network
Cross-platform software
Estonian brands
Estonian inventions
Freeware
Instant messaging clients
IOS software
MacOS instant messaging clients
Microsoft acquisitions
Pascal (programming language) software
Peer-to-peer software
Pocket PC software
Portable software
Proprietary freeware for Linux
Proprietary software that uses Qt
Silver Lake (investment firm) companies
Software that uses Qt
Symbian software
Universal Windows Platform apps
Videoconferencing software for Linux
Videotelephony
Voice over IP clients for Linux
VoIP companies of the United States
VoIP services
VoIP software
Windows instant messaging clients
Windows Mobile Standard software
Windows Phone software